Ryan Beat (born March 31, 1986) is an American professional off-road racing driver. He competes in the Championship Off-Road Series, driving the No. 51 Pro 2 Chevrolet for his team Ryan Beat Motorsports.

A two-time Lucas Oil Off Road Racing Series (LOORRS) champion in the Pro Lite class, he competed full-time in LOORRS from 2011 to 2020. Following LOORRS' shutdown, he moved to Championship Off-Road. He has also raced in the Stadium Super Trucks.

Early life and career
Beat was born in El Cajon, California, and began racing dirt bikes at the age of five. While racing for the factory Kawasaki team, he shattered his arm in a riding accident. His friend asked him to race a trophy cart and he accepted. He finished third in his first race and with help from Kenny Osborn and Black Rhino, built a UTV. He won in his third start and after 10 race wins in the SR1 UTV class, decided to build a Pro Lite truck in 2012 and finished second in the championship points that year.

Racing career

2011
Beat signed with the Hart & Huntington team, co-owned by the professional motorcyclist, Carey Hart. He campaigned the No. 851 SR-1 UTV under the Hart & Huntington umbrella.

2012
Beat was one of three drivers for Hart & Huntington Off Road racing the No. 51 ProLite for his first full season. In August, at Wild West Motorsports Park in Reno, Nevada, Beat posted his first career Lucas Oil Off Road Racing Series (LOORRS) win in the ProLite class.

2013
In the Lucas Oil Challenge Cup, Beat finished third in PRO-4 for Premiere Motorsports Group. In the last seven races of the LOORRS season, Beat finished in the top-five, six times with two podiums.

2014
Beat almost quit off-road racing but then started his own team, Ryan Beat Motorsports (RBM) in 2014.

2015
Beat won his first Pro Lite race in LOORRS competition as a driver/owner in the No. 51 Pro Lite truck.

2016
After the first two races of the season, Beat broke his foot while unloading his race truck. After surgery, and building a special brake pedal, Beat continued racing that year. Racing the No. 51 in the Pro-Lite class, Beat captured three wins and finished third in the points.

2017
In 2017, Beat traveled to Crandon, Wisconsin to compete at the birthplace of short course racing, Crandon International Raceway. Beat won his first race there.

2018
Beat returned to Team GT in the No. 51 Pro Lite truck. Competing in the No. 51 Pro Lite truck, Beat won the season opener at Wild Horse Pass Motorsports Park in Chandler, AZ. Beat went on to win the LOORRS Pro Lite Championship that year, never finishing off the podium. His first championship since entering the Pro-Lite class in 2012.

2019
Beginning in 2019, Beat wanted to win back-to-back Pro Lite Championships in the Lucas Oil Off Road Racing Series. Beat started the year with a win and finished outside the top five just one time. He then finished the year as back-to-back Pro-Lite champion (also winning the championship in 2018). At the conclusion of the 2019 season, he prepared to move to the Pro 2 class in 2020.

Beat also made his Stadium Super Trucks debut in the season opener at Circuit of the Americas, where he drove the No. 51 Continental Tire truck. He scored a podium in the first race by finishing third.

2020
Beat moved to the Pro 2 class and won in the Lucas Oil Off Road Racing Series and Championship Off-Road Series. He also finished on the podium ten times.

2021
In 2021, Beat moved to Championship Off-Road full time to race in the Pro 2 and new PRO SPEC classes; Ryan Beat Motorsports was the only team in the series with factory backing from Chevrolet. He also moved R/BM from California to North Carolina. Beat raced the first of its kind PRO SPEC truck in the 2021 Championship Off-Road Series, designing and building a race-ready benchmark prototype.

2022
Ahead of the 2022 Championship Off-Road season, Ryan Beat Motorsports expanded to field five trucks: a Pro 2 for the eponymous owner; three Pro Lites for Carson Parrish, Mason Prater, and newcomer Brody Eggleston; and a Pro SPEC for rookie Gray Leadbetter. The 2022 Champ Off Road season kicked off at Antigo. As an owner, Beat made history when his driver, Leadbetter, became the first female to win a professional Champ Off-Road race in the PRO-SPEC class.  Leadbetter would go on to win the PRO-SPEC championship, becoming the first female to win a championship in Champ Off-Road history. The win also gave Beat an additional championship as a car owner. Beat closed out the 2022 Champ Off Road season with three podium finishes at Antigo, Crandon, and ERX. In addition to short course off-road racing, Beat entered his second career Stadium Super Truck race in Nashville. Following a battle for the lead, Beat finished fourth.

2023
Ryan Beat competed for the first time at The Great American Shortcourse series' season opener at King of the Hammers on Monday, February 6th. He qualified on the pole in the PRO-2 class, and after an inverted start, he raced from sixth to win.

In media
Beat served in the 2015 film Furious 7.

He was featured in a General Tire commercial that aired from 2018 to 2021.

Motorsports career results

Career summary

Stadium Super Trucks
(key) (Bold – Pole position. Italics – Fastest qualifier. * – Most laps led.)

References

External links
 

1986 births
Living people
Off-road racing drivers
Racing drivers from California
Stadium Super Trucks drivers
Sportspeople from El Cajon, California